was a Japanese politician of the Democratic Party of Japan, a member of the House of Councillors in the Diet (national legislature). She was born in Etajima, Hiroshima, grew up in Kamakura, Kanagawa Prefecture and a graduate of Yokohama National University. She served in the assembly of Kanagawa Prefecture for five terms since 1971 and in the House of Representatives in Diet for two terms since 2000. In the 2005 general election, she lost her electoral district (Kanagawa 4) to Liberal Democrat Jun Hayashi and also failed to win a proportional seat. After that, she made an unsuccessful for the House of Councillors in 2007 when she received 59,718 votes nationwide and ranked 21st on the Democratic list while the Democratic Party only won 20 proportional seats, thereby becoming the top replacement for a seat falling vacant. On December 28, 2007, she took over the seat left vacant by Takashi Yamamoto when he died of cancer.

She was a granddaughter of Akiyama Saneyuki, a Vice Admiral in the Imperial Japanese Navy.

References

External links 
  

Members of the House of Representatives (Japan)
Members of the House of Councillors (Japan)
Female members of the House of Representatives (Japan)
Female members of the House of Councillors (Japan)
People from Kamakura
People from Etajima, Hiroshima
Politicians from Hiroshima Prefecture
Politicians from Kanagawa Prefecture
1936 births
2012 deaths
Democratic Party of Japan politicians
Yokohama National University alumni
21st-century Japanese politicians
21st-century Japanese women politicians